Beykent Educational Institutions are a group of schools in Edirne and European side of Istanbul, Turkey, established by Beykent University Chairman of the Board of Trustees Adem Çelik. Private Istanbul Beykent Primary School and Private Istanbul Beykent Anatolian High School were established in 1990. Adem Çelik, architect of the Beykent Settlement Project, established a primary school and donated it to Ministry of National Education in 1990.

Private Beykent Foreign Language Intensive High School was established in 1994. Private Edirne Beykent High School, Private Edirne Beykent Anatolian High School, and Private Edirne Beykent Primary School were established in 1997.
Private Edirne Beykent Science High School was established in 2003–2004; Private Beykent Social Sciences High School in 2005–2006; Edirne Beykent Kindergarten in 2006–2007; and Private Istanbul Beykent Science High School and Private Beykent Kindergarten were established in 2007–2008. Beykent Educational Institutions now offers classes from kindergarten through university!

Beykent Educational Institutions Mission Statement 
Beykent Educational Institutions aims to provide all students with a certain core of skills, knowledge and experience that will enable them to function effectively in a rapidly changing world. As the open minded  citizens of the 21st century they should be able to use their knowledge, attitudes, and skills in their own cultural communities and beyond their cultural borders to become effective and communicative citizens in the global community.

Beykent Educational Institutions Aims To Implement International Baccalaureate 
Beykent Educational Institutions located in two different cities, have done many important contributions to education and pioneered model studies in the region it is located since the day Beykent Educational Institutions were opened. In 2006-2007 academic years, application for candidateship to International Baccalaureate IB Middle Years Programme with the aim of reaching world standards in education and conducting more systematic studies, has been accepted on April 15, 2011. Edirne and Istanbul Beykent Educational Institutions are candidate schools for IB Primary Years Programme and IB Diploma Programme and seeking authorization in 2013-2014 academic year.

 To reach world standards in education services for students aged 3–19 by gathering educational understanding and philosophy of all Beykent Educational Institutions under a single roof.
 To ensure common approaches to develop and implement education programs      
 To standardize education management understanding in all Beykent Educational Institutions
 To gain knowledge and experience about developing update strategies of education understanding according to the requirements of the age
 To support professional development of education staff in an international level.
 To contribute to the evaluating of school’s own development with more objectively by enabling to investigate educational activities continuously from authorities outside of school and to structure educational activities in that respect.
 To enable institutional development and growth by increasing the quality of education equally and balanced in all Beykent Educational Institutions.

Schools 
Istanbul
 Istanbul Beykent Kindergarten
 Istanbul Beykent Primary School
 Istanbul Beykent Anatolian High School
 Istanbul Beykent Social Sciences High School
 Istanbul Beykent Science Studies High School
 Beykent University

Edirne
 Edirne Beykent Kindergarten
 Edirne Beykent Primary School
 Edirne Beykent College  (English Preparatory School of Anatolian High School)
 Edirne Beykent Anatolian High School
 Edirne Beykent Science Studies High School

External links 

 Beykent Educational Institutions Official Twitter Account 
 Beykent Educational Institutions Official Facebook Account

References 

Education in Istanbul
Education in Edirne
High schools in Istanbul
High schools in Edirne
Private schools in Turkey
Educational institutions established in 1990
International Baccalaureate schools in Turkey
1990 establishments in Turkey